The Pacific Jewish Center, also known as The Shul on the Beach or PJC, is a synagogue in Venice, Los Angeles, California, known for its outreach to unaffiliated and disconnected Jews. The Shul remains the last of the synagogues built in Venice during the first part of the 20th century. Although an Orthodox synagogue, worshippers who identify themselves as many different denominations are all welcomed when attending services and other events due to its location in an eclectic neighborhood.

The 1925 building, originally a power station, was identified as a City of Los Angeles landmark.

History
Pacific Jewish Center was established as Bay Cities Synagogue in the 1940s. The congregation was one of several synagogues established in Venice Beach in the 1920s (two others also on the Venice boardwalk). All except this one, and Mishkon Tefilo, had disappeared by the late 1960s. The membership had gradually dwindled until there was hardly a minyan available. However in 1977, a group of young, Orthodox Jews led by Michael Medved, and Rabbi Daniel Lapin re-established the community and it soon became the nexus of Orthodox outreach in Los Angeles for the next decade.  Lapin was the unpaid rabbi of the congregation from 1978 to 1992.

The Bar Mitzvah of Jason Gould, son of Barbra Streisand and Elliott Gould, was held at the shul.

Controversy
An attempt led by the Pacific Jewish Center to construct an eruv in the Venice Beach neighborhood met with opposition from the Sierra Club and others concerned with impacts to birds or disruption to esthetics of the beach. The California Coastal Commission conditionally approved the project in late 2006.

References

External links

KCET Departures: Pacific Jewish Center further history of PJC and Los Angeles Jewish community

Landmarks in Los Angeles
Modern Orthodox synagogues in the United States
Orthodox Judaism in Los Angeles
Orthodox synagogues in California
Synagogues in Los Angeles
Venice, Los Angeles